The 2005 Copa del Rey Final was the 103rd final of the Spanish cup competition, the Copa del Rey. The match was played at Vicente Calderón in Madrid, on 11 June 2005.

Real Betis beat Osasuna 2–1 in extra time, to win the tournament for the second time.

Match details

References

2005
1
CA Osasuna matches
Real Betis matches
June 2005 sports events in Europe
2005 in Madrid